William Villiers, 3rd Earl of Jersey, 6th Viscount Grandison,  (died 28 August 1769) was an English peer and politician from the Villiers family.

Life

He was the son of William Villiers, 2nd Earl of Jersey. Among other achievements, Villiers was a founding Governor of the Foundling Hospital, a charity which received its royal charter on 17 October 1739 to operate an orphanage for abandoned children in London.

On 23 June 1733, he married Anne Russell, Dowager Duchess of Bedford (c. 1704/1709 – 1762). She was the daughter of Scroop Egerton, 1st Duke of Bridgwater, and widow of Wriothesley Russell, 3rd Duke of Bedford. They had two sons, but only one survived them:

Frederick William Villiers, Viscount Villiers (25 March 1734 – before 11 October 1742)
George Bussy Villiers, 4th Earl of Jersey (1735–1805)

He commissioned the building of the previous Middleton Park, in Middleton Stoney, Oxfordshire.

References 

thepeerage.com. Retrieved 5 September 2009: William Villiers, 3rd Earl of the Island of Jersey

18th-century births
1769 deaths
18th-century English nobility
3
Members of the Privy Council of Great Britain
William Villiers, 03rd Earl of Jersey
Earls in the Jacobite peerage
Viscounts Grandison